Eutricopis is a genus of moths of the family Noctuidae.

Species
 Eutricopis nexilis Morrison, 1875

References
Natural History Museum Lepidoptera genus database
Eutricopis at funet

Heliothinae
Moth genera